Tomasz Antoni Muchiński (born 6 March 1966) is a retired Polish football goalkeeper and current goalkeeping coach for the Poland national football team.

References

1966 births
Living people
Polish footballers
Widzew Łódź players
Polonia Warsaw players
Hutnik Warsaw players
Association football goalkeepers
Polish football managers
Korona Kielce managers
Widzew Łódź managers